BookBox, a social enterprise located in Pondicherry, India has created ‘AniBooks’, animated stories for children with the narration appearing on-screen as Same Language Subtitles (SLS). Every word is highlighted at the exact timing with the audio narration, thus strengthening reading skills, automatically and subconsciously. BookBox has their videos on their YouTube channel, with over 45 stories in 40 languages. The business was born in 2004 from a student-driven competition, Social e-Challenge, at Stanford University.

SLS is a pedagogically sound and proven technique and has won many international awards  alongside their partner non-profit, PlanetRead created by Brij Kothari, which has also been implemented widely on film song based TV programs in India.

Languages 
BookBox offers books in the following languages:

References

External links

News coverage

Reviews 
 
 
 
 
 
 
 

Literacy in India
Social enterprises